The Trianon model collection is a set of high-quality ship models ordered by Napoléon for documentary purposes.

History 
In July 1810 Denis Decrès ordered 13 models to be constructed specially for the collection, while others, already built, were gathered. The models were built to a luxurious standard, with precious woods such as ebony and ivory used for the sculptures.

Models

Sources and References

References

Sources 
 La "Collection Trianon"
 Maquettes de la marine impériale, Collection du musée de la Marine

Model boats
History of the French Navy